Ješić is a Serbian surname. Notable people with the surname include:

Aleksandar Ješić (born 1994), Serbian footballer
Goran Ješić (born 1974), Vice President of the Democratic Party in Serbia
Marko Jesic (born 1989), Australian footballer
Miodrag Ješić (born 1958), Serbian football manager and former footballer

Serbian surnames
Slavic-language surnames
Patronymic surnames